The Cathedral Basilica of St. John the Apostle  or more formally Metropolitan Cathedral Basilica of St. John the Apostle and Evangelist, St. Michael and the Immaculate Conception also called Eger Cathedral is a religious building affiliated with the Catholic Church that functions as the cathedral of the Archdiocese of Eger, located in the city of Eger, in Hungary.

The cathedral was built between 1831 and 1837 by József Hild, commissioned by Archbishop János László Pyrker.

The cathedral is a basilica with three naves. In the middle between the nave and chancel to the east is the transept. The dome of the cathedral, 40 meters above ground, is lavishly decorated. At the rear are the two bell towers. The portal on the eastern porch is designed like a Greek temple. The monumental entrance is decorated with statues of saints: St. Stephen, St. Ladislaus, and Saints Peter and Paul. The facade is supported by Corinthian columns that reach a height of 17 meters.

Gallery

See also
Roman Catholicism in Hungary
List of cathedrals in Hungary

References

Roman Catholic cathedrals in Hungary
Buildings and structures in Eger
Roman Catholic churches completed in 1837
Church buildings with domes
19th-century Roman Catholic church buildings in Hungary